Raimo Lukander (18 April 1934 – 27 August 2005) was a Finnish footballer. He played in one match for the Finland national football team in 1961. He spent his career playing for clubs in Helsinki. In Mestaruussarja he played 100 games and scored 14 goals. He also played in second division where he scored 23 goals.

References

External links
 

1934 births
2005 deaths
Finnish footballers
Finland international footballers
Place of birth missing
Association football forwards